Chevvy may refer to:
Chevvy Pennycook, an English rugby union player
Chevvy Cooper, technical support for Australia national wheelchair rugby team

See also 
Chevy, a derivative brand name for Chevrolet vehicles